The 1962 U.S. Senate election for the state of North Dakota was held November 6, 1962. The incumbent, Republican Senator Milton Young, sought and received re-election to his fourth  term, defeating North Dakota Democratic-NPL Party candidate William Lanier of Fargo, North Dakota.

Only Young filed as a Republican, and the endorsed Democratic candidate was William Lanier of Fargo, North Dakota, who had previously faced Young in a special election held in 1946 to fill the seat which was vacated by the late John Moses. Lanier is not to be confused with former Governor of North Dakota William Langer. Young and Lanier won the primary elections for their respective parties. No independent candidates sought the senate seat.

Election results

Notes

North Dak
1962
1962 North Dakota elections